Mollalar, Agdam may refer to:
 Mollalar (40° 05' N 46° 50' E), Agdam
 Mollalar (40° 09' N 46° 52' E), Agdam